Consuelo Luz Arostegui is an American singer. She performs and records as "Consuelo Luz" is known for her Ladino and Sephardic music.

Early life
Consuelo Luz Arostegui was born in Manhattan of Latin American parents and moved to Greece with them when she was a baby. She is the daughter of a Sephardic Chilean mother and a Cuban father of Basque descent. Although raised Catholic, Luz was made aware of her Jewish ancestry at an early age. Her parents were United Nations diplomats which had her growing up in many countries, including Greece, the Philippines, Spain, Italy and Peru.

Education
Luz studied Spanish through the Overseas Cambridge University in Lima, Peru and later studied literature and music at the New School for Social Research in New York City. Further studies included drama at the Stella Adler Theater Studio.

Career
In 1974, she moved her family to New Mexico where she met Rabbi Chavah Carp in Taos, who presented her with a collection of ancient Ladino prayers with text and music with a request that she learn them and sing them at community festivals and services. This sparked Luz's interest in Ladino music and inspired her first Sephardic CD, Dezeo, in 2000.  Since then Luz has performed internationally and produced and released many more recordings and this has led her to explore more deeply her Sephardic Jewish heritage.

Her work has received positive reviews by various publications and broadcasters.  Her music has been played on the national Hearts of Space Radio network and KUNM, and has been broadcast on BBC.

Personal life
Luz has two sons and a daughter. She lives in Santa Fe, New Mexico and is involved with the Ha Makom Congregation in Santa Fe, run by Rabbi Malka Drucker.

Discography

Compilations

Featured in

References

Further reading

External links
 
additional website for new sound healing work:  www.vocalchemy.com

Living people
American people of Basque descent
American people of Cuban descent
Musicians from Santa Fe, New Mexico
Year of birth missing (living people)
American people of Jewish descent
20th-century American women singers
20th-century American singers
21st-century American women singers
21st-century American singers
Jewish women singers
Singers from New York City
Singers from New Mexico
The New School alumni